Qarfa (also spelled Garfa or Kurfa) is a village in southern Syria, administratively belonging to the Izra' District of the Daraa Governorate. Nearby localities include al-Shaykh Maskin to the northwest, Izra to the northeast, Maliha al-Atash to the east, Namir to the southeast, Khirbet Ghazaleh to the south and Abtaa to the southwest. In the 2004 census by the Central Bureau of Statistics, al-Hirak had a population of 20,760.

History
Inside a private house in Qarfa a Greek inscription dedicating a church to Saint Bacchus was discovered. The inscription was dated to 589-590 CE and written on a stone lintel decorated with a cross.

Ottoman era
In 1596, Qarfa appeared in Ottoman tax registers as a village in the Nahiya of Bani Malik al-Asraf in the Hawran Qada.  It had a population of 42 households and 15 bachelors, all Muslim. The villagers  paid a fixed tax-rate of 40% on agricultural products, including  wheat, barley, summer crops, and goats or beehives, a total of 6,451  akçe. 5/24 of the revenue went to a Waqf

In 1838, it was noted as a Muslim village (Kurfa) in the Nukrah district, east of Al-Shaykh Maskin.

Modern era
On 13 August 1962 a tribal feud in Qarfa between the al-Makayed and al-Manasser clans resulted in five people being wounded. The fighting was a result of old rivalries. Security forces arrested several people from the town and the wounded were evacuated to the hospital.

During the ongoing Syrian Civil War, which began in 2011, opposition rebels from the Free Syrian Army attacked a petrol station in Qarfa, killing a relative of high-ranking government official Rustum Ghazaleh in early January 2013.

Notable people
Rustum Ghazaleh (1953–2015), Head of Syrian Political Security Directorate

References

Bibliography

External links
 Map of the town, Google Maps
Cheikh Meskine-map; 21L

Populated places in Izra' District